The men's Greco-Roman heavyweight was a Greco-Roman wrestling event held as part of the Wrestling at the 1924 Summer Olympics programme. It was the third appearance of the event. Heavyweight was the heaviest category, including wrestlers weighing over 82.5 kilograms.

Results
Source: Official results; Wudarski

The tournament was double-elimination.

First round

Second round

After 20 minutes, Johansson was declared the winner over Deglane on points. French officials protested, and the two wrestlers were ordered to wrestle for another 6 minutes. Deglane was declared the victor, and Johansson was so disgusted with the result that he withdrew from the competition.

Third round

Fourth round

Fifth round

After this round, the undefeated Deglane and Rosenqvist and the one-loss Badó were left. Deglane and Rosenqvist advanced to the sixth round to face each other for gold, while Badó received the bronze.

Sixth round

References

Wrestling at the 1924 Summer Olympics
Greco-Roman wrestling